Mads Jørgensen (born 5 July 1998) is a Danish professional footballer who plays as a midfielder for Danish Second division club Middelfart Boldklub.

Career
Jørgensen played with the Odense Boldklub youth and U19 teams until his contract was transferred to third tier Danish club BK Marienlyst on July 1, 2017. He was named team Captain for the 2018 season at age 19. 
In January 2019, Jørgensen was released from his contract in order to sign with USL Championship club Hartford Athletic He was second on the team in minutes among midfielders despite missing the last four games of the season with an MCL injury. Soon after the conclusion of the USL 2019 season Hartford re-signed Jørgensen for the 2020 season. For the 2020 season Jørgensen played in twelve matches of the abbreviated season and scored two goals for Hartford.

In February 2021, Jørgensen signed a two year deal with Middelfart Boldklub of the Danish 2nd Division. He scored his first goal for the club on March 20, 2021 in a 3-0 win vs. Thisted FC.

Personal life
Jørgensen has a large tattoo of his mother on his upper arm. He became a vegetarian in 2019.

References

External links
USL profile

Living people
1998 births
Danish men's footballers
Footballers from Odense
BK Marienlyst players
Hartford Athletic players
Danish 2nd Division players
USL Championship players
Danish expatriate men's footballers
Expatriate soccer players in the United States
Danish expatriate sportspeople in the United States
Association football midfielders